Hello Love  may refer to:
Hello Love (The Be Good Tanyas album)
Hello Love (Chris Tomlin album)
"Hello Love" (song), a 1974 single by Hank Snow

See also
 Hello, Love (Ella Fitzgerald album)
 Hello, Love (Jean Stafford album)